Henri Bini (11 May 1931 – 28 November 2014) was a Monegasque fencer. He competed in the individual foil and épée events at the 1960 Summer Olympics.

References

External links
 

1931 births
2014 deaths
Monegasque male épée fencers
Olympic fencers of Monaco
Fencers at the 1960 Summer Olympics
Monegasque male foil fencers